Soul Rebel is the second studio album from John Givez. Kings Dream Entertainment released the album on August 28, 2015. He worked with Anthony Cruz, Dav D, DJ Rek, Jruckers, Lere, Major, Kerry Marshall, Ruslan, and Wontel, in the production of this album.

Critical reception

Awarding the album three and a half stars at New Release Today, Dwayne Lacy states, "Soul Rebel will make you uncomfortable, but will also make you take notice." Isaac Borquaye, reviewing the album for Premier Gospel, says, "it did not disappoint." Writing a review from Wade-O Radio, Aubrey McKay writes, "Soul Rebel is musically insane...It's innovative, intelligent and well thought out."

Track listing

Chart performance

References

2015 albums
John Givez albums